Hatchell is a surname. Notable people with the surname include:

John Hatchell (1788–1870), Irish lawyer and politician
Steven J. Hatchell, American sports administrator
Sylvia Hatchell (born 1952), American women's basketball coach
Thomas Hatchell, Irish Anglican cleric